John N. Constantino is a child psychiatrist and expert on neurodevelopmental disorders, especially autism spectrum disorders (ASD). Constantino is the Blanche F. Ittleson Professor of Psychiatry and Pediatrics at Washington University School of Medicine.

Constantino is known for developing the Social Responsiveness Scale (SRS), a diagnostic rating scale used to distinguish autism spectrum disorder from other child psychiatric conditions by identifying the presence and extent of social impairments. The SRS, published in 2005, consists of a parent and teacher rating scale. It has been used to assess personality, language, and social-behavioral characteristics indicative of the broader autism phenotype. The SRS is a widely used tool to help clinicians identify social impairments in individuals both with and without a diagnosis of ASD.

Constantino received the 2015 George Tarjan Award from the American Academy of Child and Adolescent Psychiatry. In 2013, he received the Alumni Achievement Award from the Washington University School of Medicine.

Biography 
Constantino earned his B.A at Cornell University in 1984. Constantino completed his medical degree at Washington University School of Medicine in 1988. After completed a 5-year a combined residency in pediatrics, general psychiatry and child psychiatry at the Albert Einstein School of Medicine, Constantino joined the faculty of Washington University School of Medicine where he has remained throughout his career. He is co-director of Washington University’s Intellectual and Developmental Disabilities Research Center (IDDRC). His research program at the IDDRC has been funded through numerous grants from the National Institutes of Health.

Research 
Constantino's research program focuses on developmental disabilities and social development from infancy through early adulthood. Some of his most influential work has used twin studies to examine the prevalence of autistic traits in the general population (also referred to as the broader autism phenotype) and in at-risk groups including individuals with attention deficit hyperactivity disorder who have heightened rates of autistic traits.

As a member of the Autism Genome Project Consortium, Constantino has been involved in genetic linkage studies of autism risk. Other research has examined patterns of familial aggregation in multiplex autism, defined as instances where two or more individuals in the same family are affected. In recent work, Constantino and his colleagues have studied developmental outcomes of over 1600 toddlers with ASD who varied in whether they were identified through prospective studies, community referral, or universal screening. Toddlers who were part of prospective studies of infants at high familial risk for ASD (typically due to having an older sibling with an ASD diagnosis) had better outcomes, including higher developmental levels and lower symptom severity.

Representative Publications 

 Constantino, J. N., Davis, S. A., Todd, R. D., Schindler, M. K., Gross, M. M., Brophy, S. L., ... & Reich, W. (2003). Validation of a brief quantitative measure of autistic traits: comparison of the social responsiveness scale with the autism diagnostic interview-revised. Journal of Autism and Developmental Disorders, 33(4), 427-433.
 Constantino, J. N., Gruber, C. P., Davis, S., Hayes, S., Passanante, N., & Przybeck, T. (2004). The factor structure of autistic traits. Journal of Child Psychology and Psychiatry, 45(4), 719-726.
Constantino, J. N., & Todd, R. D. (2003). Autistic traits in the general population: a twin study. Archives of General Psychiatry, 60(5), 524-530.
Constantino, J. N., & Todd, R. D. (2005). Intergenerational transmission of subthreshold autistic traits in the general population. Biological Psychiatry, 57(6), 655-660.
Constantino, J. N., Zhang, Y. I., Frazier, T., Abbacchi, A. M., & Law, P. (2010). Sibling recurrence and the genetic epidemiology of autism. American Journal of Psychiatry, 167(11), 1349-1356.

References

External links 

Faculty Home Page
Intellectual and Developmental Disability Research Center
Google Scholar Profile

Living people
American scientists
American physicians
Washington University School of Medicine alumni
Washington University in St. Louis faculty
Cornell University alumni
Year of birth missing (living people)